Gooische Vrouwen (English title: Vipers Nest) is a 2011 Dutch film. It is based on the television series Gooische Vrouwen. After the creators announced that the fifth season of the series would be the last, they revealed on 7 November 2009 that they were working on a film adaptation. It earned more than 41.7 million Euro in the box office. The sequel Gooische Vrouwen 2 became the best-visited film in the Netherlands in 2014.

Plot 
The film follows the four main characters from the TV series. Cheryl catches her husband cheating on her, Anouk half-accidentally commits art fraud, Claire leaves her fiancé at the altar, and Roelien fights with her family because of her pro-environment views. To escape from all this, they decide to attend a self-help seminar in a French castle. When this turns out to not help them at all, they then go shopping in Paris. Meanwhile, their husbands' lives become a mess and they miss their wives so much. After a tearful call from Cheryl's husband, the wives decide it's time to come back home.

Cast 

 Linda de Mol as Cheryl Morero
 Susan Visser as Anouk Verschuur
 Tjitske Reidinga as Claire van Kampen
 Lies Visschedijk as Roelien Grootheeze
 Peter Paul Muller as Martin Morero
 Leopold Witte as Evert Lodewijkx
 Daniël Boissevain as Tom Blaauw
 Derek de Lint as Dr. Ed Rossi
 Marcel Musters as Dirk Stubbe
 Alex Klaasen as Yari
 Beppie Melissen as Cor Hogenbirk
 Koen Wauters as Jean-Philippe
 Loes Luca as Barbara
 Maike Meijer as Fay
 Mea de Jong as Merel van Kampen
 Lisa Bouwman as Vlinder Blaauw
 Priscilla Knetemann as Louise Lodewijkx
 Dorus Witte as Annabel Lodewijkx

Soundtrack 
The soundtrack album was released by EMI.

References

External links 
 
 

2011 films
2010s Dutch-language films
Dutch comedy-drama films
Films based on television series
Films set in the Netherlands
Films set in France